Rozgart  is a village in the administrative district of Gmina Gronowo Elbląskie, within Elbląg County, Warmian-Masurian Voivodeship, in northern Poland.

History 

The village was founded in the 14th century (around 1312-14). Its previous name "Rosengart" or "Rosengarten" is believed to stem from the word/name "Roßgarten".

In the 16th century, Mennonite settlers also came to the village of Rosengart.
The Rosengart Mennonite community was part of the Thiensdorf-Pr.Rosengart parish; Mennonite churches were located in Markushof (today: Markusy) and Thiensdorf (today: Jezioro).

In 1890, a separate Mennonite church was built in Pr. Rosengart - which is now a Catholic church.

Population 

In 1773, 299 people (in 59 families) lived in the village. 

In 1939, the population number was 384 (217 Protestants, 108 Catholics, 59 other confessions - mostly Mennonites).

Today, the village has a population of 150.

References

Rozgart